Bilicenii may refer to one of two communes in Sîngerei District, Moldova:

Bilicenii Noi
Bilicenii Vechi